Alfred Schön (born 12 January 1962) is a German football manager and former player.

References

External links

1962 births
Living people
German footballers
German expatriate footballers
Expatriate footballers in France
Bundesliga players
SV Waldhof Mannheim players
Stuttgarter Kickers players
Ligue 1 players
Ligue 2 players
AS Nancy Lorraine players
FC Carl Zeiss Jena players
Germany youth international footballers
Olympic footballers of West Germany
West German footballers
Footballers at the 1984 Summer Olympics
German football managers
TSG 1899 Hoffenheim managers
Association football midfielders